Bunolistriodon is an extinct genus of pig-like animals from Eurasia and Africa during the Miocene.

The exact position of Bunolistriodon has been subject to debate. It has been considered a synonym of Listriodon in the past, and sometimes still is. However, today most authorities recognize the genus as distinct.

References

Prehistoric Suidae
Miocene even-toed ungulates
Prehistoric even-toed ungulate genera
Miocene mammals of Europe
Miocene mammals of Asia
Miocene mammals of Africa
Prehistoric mammal genera